Carl E. Rolling (September 25, 1893 – November 8, 1954) was an American Negro league outfielder in the 1920s.

A native of Springfield, Missouri, Rolling played for the St. Louis Giants in 1920. He died in Kansas City, Missouri in 1954 at age 61.

References

External links
 and Seamheads

1893 births
1954 deaths
St. Louis Giants players
Baseball outfielders
Baseball players from Missouri
Sportspeople from Springfield, Missouri
20th-century African-American sportspeople